Naveen Mohammed Ali is an actor, who works in the Tamil film industry. Naveen made his directorial debut with the critically acclaimed Moodar Koodam in 2013. He produces films under his production company, White Shadows Productions.

Beginnings
Naveen was born in a Muslim Tamil family, in Gobi in Erode District. His real name is Naveen Mohammed Ali, which he acknowledged in a telephone interview with Samaran and shared he has turned atheist later. He began his career as an engineer and worked in EID Parry and Glaxo Smithkline, Delhi. Later, Naveen joined Chimbudevan as an assistant director and worked in films like Imsai Arasan 23-aam Pulikesi. He worked as an associate director for Pandiraj's national award-winning film Pasanga.

Career

Naveen began his film career as writer, director, and producer with his first movie, Moodar Koodam. When Naveen narrated the script of Moodar Koodam to producers, many rejected, some wanted corrections and many questioned the narrative style. So he decided to produce the film on his own and launched White Shadows Productions. Director Pandiraj (of Pasanga movie fame) distributed the movie through his production house. Moodar Koodam was critically acclaimed and Naveen was appreciated for his screenplay, direction, and dialogues, winning the Best Dialogues award at the 8th Annual Vijay TV Awards. Naveen is currently producing Kolanji. Kolanji has a multi-cast ensemble, including Samuthirakani and Sanghavi.

In 2018, Naveen completed filming the fantasy thriller Alaudhinin Arputha Camera, where he starred alongside Anandhi. However, the film remains unreleased due to the financial dispute with Swarna Sethuraman of Flash Films who objected the film's release until Naveen pays his alleged past dues.

Filmography

Awards

 Best Dialogues – 8th Star Vijay TV Awards
 Best Social Outlook Film 2013 – Neeya Naana Awards 2013 (Vijay TV)
 Best Production - BehindWoods Gold Awards 2013
 Best Dialogue -  Vikadan Awards 2013 
 Official Selection - 11th Chennai International Film Festival

References

Living people
Tamil film directors
Film directors from Chennai
Male actors in Tamil cinema
Film producers from Chennai
Screenwriters from Tamil Nadu
Year of birth missing (living people)